This is a list of Members of Parliament (MPs) elected to the House of Representatives of Malta for the 11th Legislature since Independence at the 2008 general election.

The list is arranged by office. New MPs elected since the general election and changes in party allegiance are noted.

Graphical representation of the House of Representatives
This is a comparison of the party strengths in the Maltese House of Representatives:

List of MPs elected in the general election including changes during legislature


See also
Elections in Malta
Politics of Malta

References

MPs

Lists of members of the parliament of Malta